Calochortus venustus is a California species of flowering plants in the lily family known by the common name butterfly mariposa lily. It is a perennial herb that grows in grasslands and open wooded areas.

Distribution and habitat
The species is endemic to California ranging from Shasta County to San Diego County, particularly common in the San Gabriel Mountains, the southern part of the Sierra Nevada, and the Coast Ranges between Oakland and Los Angeles.

Description
Calochortus venustus is a perennial herb producing a branching stem 10 to 60 centimetres tall. There is a basal leaf up to 20 centimetres long which withers by the time the plant blooms.

The inflorescence is a loose cluster of 1 to 6 erect, bell-shaped flowers. The flowers are variable in size and palette; they are often showy and intricately patterned. The petals may be a variety of colours from white to pale pink or purple to bright red or orange, sporting a large dark central blotch and a smaller, paler blotch above.  They generally have three curving sepals 2 or 3 centimetres long and three oval-shaped, clawed petals up to 5 centimetres long.

The fruit is an angled capsule 5 or 6 centimetres long.

References

External links
Calflora Database: Calochortus venustus (Butterfly mariposa lily)
Jepson Manual eFlora (TJM2) treatment of Calochortus venustus
United States Department of Agriculture Plants Profile of Calochortus venustus
UC Calphotos gallery: Calochortus venustus images

venustus
Endemic flora of California
Flora of the Sierra Nevada (United States)
Natural history of the California chaparral and woodlands
Natural history of the California Coast Ranges
Natural history of the Santa Monica Mountains
Natural history of the Transverse Ranges
Plants described in 1835
Taxa named by George Bentham
Flora without expected TNC conservation status